The men's hammer throw at the 2018 Commonwealth Games, as part of the athletics programme, took place in the Carrara Stadium on 8 April 2018.

Records
Prior to this competition, the existing world and Games records were as follows:

Schedule
The schedule was as follows:

All times are Australian Eastern Standard Time (UTC+10)

Results
With sixteen entrants, the event was held as a straight final.

Final

Note
 Also a British record

References

Men's hammer throw
2018